Novotel Nha Trang is a hotel located in Nha Trang, Khánh Hòa Province, Vietnam. It is located in the heart of the city of Nha Trang, a coastal resort. Nha Trang is about 450 km north Ho Chi Minh City and 1200 km south of Hanoi. The hotel has 154 guestrooms including 2 suites, and 16 floors with one basement and a car park.

External links
Novotel Nha Trang
Novotel Nha Trang

Nha Trang
Hotels in Vietnam
Nha Trang
Hotel buildings completed in 2008
2008 establishments in Vietnam
Hotels established in 2008
Buildings and structures in Khánh Hòa province